Lionel Chok Ko Hon is a Singaporean film-maker and director. His documentary, Geraldine, was premiered at the New York International Independent Film & Video Festival. His other short films were also screened in New York City and Singapore. Since completing the Intensive Directing Workshop at New York University, he has written the telemovie Dirty Laundry (released in 2004 and shot on HD video).

Filmography

Series
Heritage Series (1988)
– awarded Best Documentary finalist in the New York Festivals 
– Best Documentary nominee at the Asian Television Awards 1988

Documentaries
Geraldene (2001)
– Official selection in the New York International Independent Film and Video Festival 2001

Features
To Speak (2007)

Plays
Nonsensical Idiosyncrasies (2001)
Nonsensical Idiosyncrasies 2
Hearing Voices (2002)
Threesome (2004)
Adultery (2005)

Short films
Writer's Block (2001)
Life After (2001)
Time (1999)
Nana & Damien (2005)
Crossroad (2006)

Digital Online films
24 Hours in Central Singapore

HD Telemovie
Dirty Laundry (2004)

Music Videos
WISH (2006)

Musicals
Swingle (2006)

Awards
Best Documentary finalist in the New York Festivals
Best Documentary nominee at the Asian Television Awards (1988)
2007 Digital Film Fiesta Audience Choice Award

See also
Cinema of Singapore
Royston Tan

External links

Lionel Chok's website
www.1magine.com
Bio at Substation
LC at Substation
Adultery 
wirecrossing.org
Wirecrossing: 24 Hours in Central Singapore
Swingle
Nana & Damien 
"Eco 4 the World" – from Internet Movie Database (2006)
Crossroad – 2007 Digital Film Fiesta Audience Choice Award
To Speak Movie's website 
sinema.sg
youth.sg
www.thaicinema.org
Urban Nomad Film Fest
新竹市文化局影像博物館

Singaporean film directors
Singaporean film editors
Singaporean people of Chinese descent
Singaporean film producers
Singaporean documentary filmmakers
Living people
Year of birth missing (living people)